Mr. Mystery is a mystery-fiction book series written by Jim Aitchison under the pseudonym of James Lee (also the author of the Mr. Midnight series).  Unlike Mr. Midnight, it has a fixed group of main characters.  The series is published by Angsana Books, Flame Of The Forest Publishing. 36 books in the series, including 6 Special Edition titles, have been published.

Plot
The story is about several friends who run a detective company, named Soh & Co, in an old storeroom behind Alvin Soh's mother's jewelry shop. A large sign hangs outside proudly proclaiming:

                                       
                                         SOH & CO
                                      INVESTIGATORS
                                 We investigate anything
                              No case too big or too small

They are frequently roped into solving crimes that baffle the police by their suspicious clients, frowned upon by their friend in the police, Sergeant Soo, as well as Alvin's mother, Gracie Soh. They are both worried about safety since Alvin’s father was murdered.

Characters

Main characters
Alvin Soh: He is the main protagonist in Mr. Mystery. He lives with his mother, Gracie Soh. His gel-slicked hair is always cut very short at the sides, which seems to make his ears stick out. In The Mystery of the Sydney Slayings, he learns that his father was murdered by The Snake.
Tan Wei Ling: She has a collection of criminal files in their headquarters. She became jealous when Alvin became close to Tai, The Snake's daughter. She has a prominent beauty spot. She always wears white tee and jeans. In The Mystery of the Unlucky Undertaker, Wei Ling has a new boyfriend, Tony Hall. In The Mystery of the Bolting Burglar, it is hinted that she might have a new boyfriend called Tomas.
Rafferty "Rafe" Lim: He is Alvin's best friend and his senior investigator. He is so handsome that he looks like a member of a boy band. He is also Mars Wong's boyfriend. In The Mystery of the Rajah's Ruby, it is revealed that he can fly a plane.
Mars Wong: She is a beautiful girl and is Rafe's girlfriend. She is close to Tan Wei Ling and Sabrina Sim, a girl who is not an investigator. She is the one who found out Tai is actually The Snake's daughter. Before she started dating Rafe, she had a boyfriend, Edmund Lim (The Mystery of the Eagle's Eye).
Azizul: He always wears a cap. Azizul enjoys teasing Wei Ling just to see her beauty spot bob up and down. He has a girlfriend, Farisha, but she is not an investigator. Fishing is his favourite hobby.
Sinchita: Sinchita can draw very well. She has a cat, Kuching. Sinchita believes relationships do not last long, just like what happened to her father and mother. In The Mystery of the Seventh Sword, she is unintentionally poisoned by The Snake, after she cut her finger with the poisoned envelope meant for Alvin, slipping into a coma. In the next book, The Mystery of the Missing Murderer, she died, leaving five investigators in the team.
Tony Hall: Tony likes to surf. He became Wei Ling's boyfriend in The Mystery of the Unlucky Undertaker. He is very patient and always holds up for Alvin. He becomes part of the group in The Mystery of the Clueless Corpse. Tony has not appeared since The Mystery of the Murdered Maid when he went back to America, meaning that he might have left the group permanently.
Arpeeta: Arpeeta is Sinchita's little sister and has waited a long time to join Alvin's group of investigators. She first appears, and becomes part of the group, in The Mystery of the Clownish Corpse. She is shown to have a good singing voice (The Mystery of the Christmas Carol), and also writes poetry (The Mystery of the Bothered Brother).

Minor characters
Sergeant Samuel Soo: He was friends with Alan Soh, Alvin's father. Sergeant Soo always helps Alvin in his investigations, whether he likes it or not. He became protective towards Alvin and his team after he learned that Alan was murdered by The Snake. He has a romantic relationship with Gracie Soh, and they become engaged in The Mystery of the Dead Diva.
Gracie Soh: Alvin's mother, who owns a jewelry shop. She is often worried about Alvin's safety during his investigations, especially after she finds out how Alan Soh and Sinchita were killed.
The Snake: Master criminal, leader of the city's largest crime syndicate. Alvin's deadliest enemy. He always wears a green reptile mask. He is extremely dangerous and always tries to get rid of Alvin and his team as they always outsmart him. In The Mystery of the Rajah's Ruby, it is revealed he has a daughter, Tai.
Tai: Her full name is Tai Pan, based on a poisonous snake. She is very beautiful, and Alvin used to date her until Mars gave him a warning. Tai often goes against her father's will and warns Alvin about the danger that's coming, causing her father to question her loyalty in The Mystery of the Man Who Had to Die. She was killed by a French criminal in The Mystery of the Gangster's Gun.
Cordelia Chew: Mars' friend. She tries to get Alvin to be her boyfriend in The Mystery of the Terrified Teacher. Both Alvin and Tony are infatuated by her.
Alan Soh: Alvin's father and an amateur detective who was killed by the Snake.

Books 
The latest book in the Mr. Mystery series is Mr. Mystery #30, The Mystery Of The Missing Motive.

External links
 Mr Mystery on the Flame Of The Forest website

Series of books
Mystery fiction